Frank Stanton (born 7 February 1940 in St Leonards, New South Wales), also known by the nickname of "Biscuits", is an Australian former professional rugby league footballer who played in the 1960s, and was a successful club and national representative coach in the 1970s and 1980s. He was educated at North Sydney Boys High School.  Both his playing and his club coaching careers were with the Manly Warringah Sea Eagles, although he later also went on to coach the Balmain Tigers and North Sydney Bears. He enjoyed success as coach of the Australian national side from 1978 to 1984, being at the helm in the period when the Kangaroos began to consistently dominate the other rugby league playing nations. Since the death of Norm Provan on 13 October 2021, Stanton is both the oldest and earliest winning of all the living premiership winning coaches.

Player
A local Manly junior graded from the Belrose Eagles club, Stanton was a versatile back who played 129 first grade games for Manly between 1961 and 1969.

He made two state appearances for New South Wales and was honoured with national selection for the 1963 Kangaroo tour. He appeared in 18 minor matches on this tour, but did not play in any of the Tests, with the Australian selectors at the time having a wealth of three-quarter talent available in Graeme Langlands, Reg Gasnier, Peter Dimond, Michael Cleary, Ken Irvine and Les Johns.

Coach
After retiring as a player at the end of the 1969 season, Stanton became the Sea Eagles’ reserve grade coach in 1971, leading the team to the reserve grade premiership in 1973. In 1975, he took over as coach of Manly-Warringah from Ron Willey and was in charge of the side for five seasons until the end of 1979, guiding Manly to premiership success in 1976 and 1978. The 1976 win was a triumph for the astute and powerful Manly triumvirate of captain Bob Fulton, coach Stanton and club secretary Ken Arthurson, who would all go onto higher honours in the game over the next two decades. Stanton spent 1980 coaching Redcliffe in the Brisbane Rugby League premiership, leading the Dolphins to a fifth-place finish.

Stanton was appointed coach of New South Wales in 1978 when selection of players for interstate games was still determined by the traditional "state of residence" rules. In 1982, Stanton replaced Ted Glossop as the Blues’ State of Origin coach, being the first NSW coach to contest a three-game Origin series. Queensland won the series 2–1 and Glossop returned to coach the Blues in 1983. Stanton again coached New South Wales in the 1984 Origin series, suffering another 2–1 loss to the Maroons.

Stanton was appointed Australia's Test coach in 1978 and over the next six years was rewarded with whitewash wins over Great Britain (1979, 1982 and 1984), New Zealand (1978, 1980 and 1982) and France (1981 and 1982). His 1982 side also won the first-ever Test played against Papua New Guinea.

The 1978 Kangaroo tourists, after a successful 2–1 Ashes campaign in England, wound up the French section of the tour in embarrassment, unexpectedly losing both Tests in France. Whilst the refereeing in the first Test came in for criticism, Stanton acknowledged no excuses for the Australians’ defeat in the second Test. The 1982 Kangaroo touring side later avenged the French humiliation of 1978, becoming Australia's most successful ever national side by going through the 23-match tour of Papua New Guinea, England and France unbeaten and becoming known as the Invincibles.

Stanton retired as national coach in 1983 and was succeeded by Queensland coach Arthur Beetson. Beetson only lasted for the 1983 series against New Zealand, and was replaced after Australia had won the first Test at Auckland's Carlaw Park, but lost the second Test at Lang Park in Brisbane. For the 1984 Ashes series against Great Britain, Stanton returned for his final stint as Australian coach. The Aussies won the series 3–0 and Stanton retired from representative coaching. During his time as national coach, Stanton oversaw the start of the stellar international careers of players such as Wally Lewis, Wayne Pearce, Mal Meninga, Peter Sterling, Brett Kenny, Kerry Boustead and Eric Grothe.

Stanton was the chief executive of the Manly club from the late 1980s through to the mid-1990s. He was also the interim chief executive of the Melbourne Storm for a period from 2004 to 2006, and was a board director of the Storm as well.

In 2010, Stanton was temporarily re-appointed as Storm caretaker-CEO following the sacking of Matt Hanson in the wake of the Storm's salary cap scandal. He remained in this role for three months until Ron Gauci took over.

After his season with Redcliffe in 1980, Stanton then shifted to Balmain to coach the Tigers from 1981 until 1986, during which they won the mid-week Panasonic Cup in 1985. From 1987 to 1989, he coached North Sydney and in 1978, 1979, 1982, and 1984 he coached both the NSW State of Origin and the City teams.

References

Sources
 Andrews, Malcolm (2006) The ABC of Rugby League Austn Broadcasting Corpn, Sydney

 
 

 

1940 births
Living people
Australia national rugby league team coaches
Australia national rugby league team players
Australian rugby league coaches
Australian rugby league players
Balmain Tigers coaches
Manly Warringah Sea Eagles captains
Manly Warringah Sea Eagles coaches
Manly Warringah Sea Eagles players
New South Wales Rugby League State of Origin coaches
North Sydney Bears coaches
Redcliffe Dolphins coaches
Rugby league centres
Rugby league halfbacks
Rugby league players from Sydney
Sport Australia Hall of Fame inductees
People educated at North Sydney Boys High School